L.R.Institute of Engineering and Technology is an engineering college situated in Jabli-Kyar village near Oachghat on State Highway 06 of Himachal Pradesh in Solan district. It is affiliated with Himachal Pradesh University and Himachal Pradesh Technical University and accredited by AICTE. The institute offers courses in Civil Engineering, Mechanical Engineering, Computer Science, Information Technology and Electrical Engineering.

History 
The institute was founded in 2008 by Kailash Chand Goel and the Managing Director Lokesh Bharti.

External links
 

Engineering colleges in Himachal Pradesh
Education in Solan district
Educational institutions established in 2008
2008 establishments in Himachal Pradesh